The Yurok (Karuk language: Yurúkvaarar / Yuru Kyara - "downriver Indian; i.e. Yurok Indian") are an Indigenous people from along the Klamath River and Pacific coast, whose homelands are located in present-day California stretching from Trinidad in the south to Crescent City in the north.

The Yurok live on the Yurok Indian Reservation, Resighini Rancheria, and surrounding communities in Humboldt, Del Norte and Trinity counties. Most Yurok land is owned by timber corporations or is part of national parks and forests. This forest management has significantly dis-empowered the Yurok people and disrupted their ability to access natural resources, land, and practice Indigenous lifeways.

Etymology
The Yurok refer to themselves as 'Oohl ("person") or 'O'loolekweesh 'o'l / 'Oolekwoh (lit. "'o'loolekw [= "village"] dwellers"). Ner'ernerh / Nert'ernerh ("Coast people, i.e. Coast Yurok") refers to Yurok on the coast and Hehlkeeklaa ("Klamath River people, i.e. Klamath River Yurok") refers to Yurok who live along the Klamath River. Pueleeklaa / Pueleekla'  or Puelekuekla' / Puelekueklaa'  ("down river/downstream people, i.e. River Yurok") is used to distinguish themselves from the upriver (Klamath River) living Karuk (Pecheeklaa / Pecheekla = "up river/upstream people, i.e. Karuk people"). Saa'agoch' / Saa'agochehl ("Yurok language") is one of two Algic languages spoken in California, the other being Wiyot (therefore they are culturally similar to the Wiyot people) and is currently undergoing a successful revitalization effort.

History
Traditionally, the Yurok lived in permanent villages along the Klamath River. Therefore they were also called by neighboring Athabascan-speaking tribes as Taa-che'-dvn-dv-ne (Upper Coquille-Tututni) ("Klamath River mouth People") or Dvn-mvsh-taa-'vn'-dv-ne (Euchre Creek Tututni) and Dvtlh-mvsh Xee-she'n (Chetco-Tolowa), both meaning "Klamath River People." Some of their villages date back to the 14th century.

The Yurok's first contact with non-Natives occurred when Spanish explorers entered their territory in 1775. Fur traders and trappers from the Hudson's Bay Company came in 1827. Following encounters with white settlers moving into their aboriginal lands during a gold rush in 1850, the Yurok were faced with disease and massacres that reduced their population by 75%. In 1855, following the Klamath and Salmon River War, the Lower Klamath River Indian Reservation was created by executive order. The reservation boundaries included a portion of the Yurok's territory and some Yurok villages.

Contemporary 

Fishing, hunting, and gathering remain important to tribal members. Basket weaving and woodcarving are important arts. A traditional hamlet of wooden plank buildings, called Sumeg, was built in 1990. The Jump Dance and Brush Dance remain part of tribal ceremonies.  The tribes involvement in condor reintroduction, along with traditional burning, environmental restoration, wildfire preparedness, the drought, and juvenile fish kill, was discussed with Governor Gavin Newsom when he visited in June 2021.

The tribe owns and operates a casino, river jet boat tours and other tourist attractions.

Language

Yurok or Saa'agoch' / Saa'agochehl ("Yurok language") is one of two Algic languages spoken in California, the other being Wiyot. Between twenty and one hundred people speak the Yurok language today. The language is passed on through master-apprentice teams and through singing. Language classes have been offered through Humboldt State University and through annual language immersion camps.

An unusual feature of the language is that certain nouns change depending upon whether there is one, two, or three of the object. For instance, one human being would be ko:ra''' or ko'r, two human beings would be ni'iyel, and three human beings would be nahkseyt.

 Culture 

 Food culture 
They fished for salmon along rivers, gathered ocean fish and shellfish, hunted game, and gathered plants. Yurok ate varied berries and meats, but whale meat was prized above others. Yuroks did not hunt whales, instead, they waited until a drift whale washed up onto the beach or place near the water and dried the flesh. Salmon is another vital source of food.

 Material culture 
The major currency of the Yurok nations was the dentalium shell (terkwterm). Alfred L. Kroeber wrote of the Yurok perception of the shell: "Since the direction of these sources is 'downstream' to them, they speak in their traditions of the shells living at the downstream and upstream ends of the world, where strange but enviable peoples live who suck the flesh of univalves."

 Condor and forest restoration 
California condors are understood as beings of great spiritual power by the Indigenous people in the Pacific Northwest and California. Yurok, Wiyot, and other tribes use the shed feathers in ceremonies to treat the sick. The Yurok Tribe Northern California Condor Restoration Program is working with the local Redwood National and State Parks to restore the California condor to the area where they were last spotted around 1892. The Bald Hills are part of the Yurok Tribal lands. Due to the cultural and ecological importance of the condor, the tribe began a program in 2008 to reintroduce the condor. While based on the latest scientific protocols, Yurok Traditional Ecological Knowledge provided by the tribal elders informs the restoration program. In preparation, they have tested local wildlife for organochlorine pesticides such as DDT and for exposure to lead. They built a re-introduction and handling facility and received a clear Environment Impact Statement. An adult condor was brought in to mentor four juvenile birds who would be released. An adult not only serves as a role model but also enforces the social hierarchy that is crucial to the survival of a flock. Two condors were released in May 2022 from a pen in Redwood National Park. A third juvenile was released a few weeks later with the fourth being allowed outside the release pen in July. Each bird must leave the program area voluntarily after entering and exiting a staging pen with the birds being monitored for their safety by researchers who remain hidden in a repurposed shipping container. The staggered releases allow the social draw of still-captive condors to keep the freed birds nearby so the team can observe the birds, who are outfitted with GPS transmitters. By mid-November, a total of eight birds had been released.

In 1995, researchers observed that control of reservation and allotment natural resources has been withheld from them [Yurok people] under the auspices of scientific forest management." Managing the reservation for the benefit of the timber industry or a "fine stand of timber" prevented Yurok modes of subsistence. As such the researchers note that Yurok were divested from their forest resources for the following reasons: "by straightforward expropriation of their lands, as Yurok property rights were ignored and access to gathering sites was cut off; and through ecological change brought about by a shift in management regimes."

Forest management, which is profit-focused and destructive, impacts forests on Yurok lands, since the environment is interconnected despite political boundaries established by settlers. Additionally, in United States forestry programs, Indigenous peoples are only given the right to "alienate the land but not to manage the vegetation." In the case of the Yurok, "vegetation management and Yurok culture and economy are closely linked" and as a result "the increasing unsuitability of the changed forest for Yurok subsistence helped push the Yurok to sell their land."

 Sacred artifact repatriation 
In 2010, 217 sacred artifacts were returned to the Yurok tribe by the Smithsonian Institution. The condor feathers, headdresses and deerskins had been part of the Smithsonian's collection for almost 100 years and represent one of the largest Native American repatriations.  The regalia will be used in Yurok ceremonies and on display at the tribe's cultural center.

 Society 

 Villages 
Yurok Villages ('o'loolekw - "village") were composed of individual families that lived in separate, single-family homes. The house was owned by the eldest male and in each lived several generations of men related on their father's side of the family as well as their wives, children, daughters’ husbands, unmarried relatives, and adopted kin. Yurok villages also consisted of sweat houses and menstrual huts. Sweat houses were designated for men of an extended patrilineal family as a place to gather. While during their menstruation cycles, women stayed in separate under-ground huts for ten days. Additionally, inheritance of land was predominantly patrilineal. The majority of the estate was passed down to the fathers’ sons. Daughters and male relatives were also expected to acquire a portion of the estate.

 Social organization 
Yurok society had no chiefs, but in each village, a wealthy man known as a peyerk acted as leader, who was trained by elders. The peyerk's training would include a vision quest in which he would communicate with the natural environment and the spirit world. Peyerk from many villages came together to settle tribal disputes and also hosted tribal ceremonies. At these times, the peyerk would supply food and shelter for the Yurok people and special clothing for the dancers. Peyerk lived in homes at higher elevation, wore finer clothing, and sometimes spoke foreign languages.

Yurok medicine people were usually women. Women would become shamans after dreaming of being told to do so. Another shaman would then assist her in a ritual dance. Shamans would use plants, prayer, and rituals to heal people and also performed ceremonies to ensure successful hunting, fishing, and gathering.

Every year the Yurok came together for what was known as the World Renewal Ceremony, where songs and dances which had been passed on through many generations would be performed. Dancers would wear elaborate clothing for the occasion.

Some sources refer to it Yurok society as socially stratified because communities were divided between syahhlew ("rich"), wa's'oyowok' / wa'soyowok' ("poor"), and ka'aal ("slaves"). The syahhlew were the only group allowed to perform religious duties. Furthermore, they had homes at higher elevations, wore nicer clothing, and spoke in a distinctive manner. The primary reason men became slaves was because they owed money to certain families. Nonetheless, slavery was not considered to be a significant institution. Overall, the higher a man's social ranking was, the more valuable his life was considered.

 Marriage 
When daughters got married, Yurok families would receive a payment from her husband. For the most part, girls were highly valued in the family. The amount of money paid by a man determined the social status of the couple. A wealthy man, who could afford to pay a large sum, increased the couple and their children's rank within the community. When married, both spouses held onto their personal properties but the bride lived with the groom's family and took his last name. Men who were unable to pay the full sum of money could pay half the cost for the bride. In doing so, the couple was considered “half-married.” Half-married couples lived with the bride's family and the groom would then become a slave for them. Furthermore, their children would take on the mother's last name. In cases of divorce, either spouse could initiate their split. The most frequent reason for divorce was if the wife was infertile. If the woman wanted a divorce and to take the children with her, her family had to refund the husband for his initial payment.

Demographics

Estimates for the pre-contact populations of most native groups in California have varied substantially. Alfred L. Kroeber put the 1770 population of the Yurok at 2500. Sherburne F. Cook initially agreed, but later raised this estimate to 3100.

By 1870, the Yurok population had declined to 1350. By 1910 it was reported as 668 or 700.

The 2000 United States Census indicates that there were 4413 Yurok living in California, combining those of one tribal descent and those with ancestors of several different tribes and groups.  There were 5,793 Yurok living throughout the United States. The Yurok Indian Reservation is California's largest tribe, with 6357 members as of 2019.

On November 24, 1993, the Yurok Tribe adopted a constitution that details the jurisdiction and territory of their lands. Under the Hoopa-Yurok Settlement Act of 1988, Pub. L. 100-580, qualified applicants had the option of enrolling in the Yurok Tribe. Of the 3,685 qualified applicants for the Settlement Roll, 2,955 people chose Yurok membership.  227 of those members had a mailing address on the Yurok reservation, but a majority lived within 50 miles of the reservation. The Yurok Tribe is currently the largest group of Native Americans in the state of California, with 6357 enrolled members living in or around the reservation.  The Yurok reservation of 63,035 acres (25,509 ha) has an 80% poverty rate and 70% of the inhabitants do not have telephone service or electricity, according to the tribe's Web page.

Notable people

Rick Bartow (1946–2016), painter, printmaker, and sculptor
Archie Thompson (1919–2013), elder who helped revitalize the Yurok language 
Lucy Thompson (1856–1932), first indigenous Californian woman to be published

See also
 Yurok traditional narratives

Notes

References
 Cook, Sherburne F. 1956. "The Aboriginal Population of the North Coast of California". Anthropological Records 16:81-130. University of California, Berkeley.
 Cook, Sherburne F. 1976. The Conflict between the California Indian and White Civilization. University of California Press, Berkeley.
 Kroeber, A. L. 1925. Handbook of the Indians of California. Bureau of American Ethnology Bulletin No. 78. Washington, D.C.
 Kroeber, A. L. 1976. Yurok Myths.  University of California Press, Berkeley.
Hinton, Leanne. Flutes of Fire: Essays on California Indian Languages. Berkeley: Heyday Books, 1994. .
 Pritzker, Barry M. A Native American Encyclopedia: History, Culture, and Peoples''. Oxford: Oxford University Press, 2000. .

External links

Yurok Tribe of the Yurok Reservation

 
Native American tribes in California
History of Del Norte County, California
Native Americans in Del Norte County, California